A Turkmen passport is issued to the citizens of Turkmenistan for the purposes of  international travel. Since July 2008, biometric passports have been introduced, making Turkmenistan the first country in the ex-USSR mid-Asia region to issue an ICAO compliant biometric passport. 

Current passports of Turkmen citizens are valid for travel abroad until they apply for new passports. In April 2013 were approved the new samples and descriptions of the biometric passport, with more protection, increased volume of electronic chips, and high-quality manufacturing. Previously issued passports are still valid until expiration. It is issued by the State Migration Service of Turkmenistan.

Appearance 
Turkmen passports are dark green in color, with the inscription "Turkmenistan" and "Passport" in Turkmen and English on the cover. The Coat of arms of Turkmenistan is embossed in the center of the cover. The passport is produced in Turkmen and English languages.

Identity page
The identity page of the Turkmen passport contains the following information:
 Passport holder's photo
 Type (P for passport)
 Country code (TKM)
 Passport number
 Surname
 Given name
 Citizenship
 Date of birth
 Sex
 Place of birth
 Date of issue
 Date of expiry
 Personal number
 Issuing authority
 Holder's signature

Visa requirements

In 2022, Turkmen citizens had visa-free or visa on arrival access to 58 countries and territories, ranking the Turkmen passport 74th in the world according to The Passport Index.

Issues
Turkmenistan is one of the few countries that does not renew expired passports at their foreign diplomatic missions. Instead, the embassies and the consulates of Turkmenistan put a stamp on the last pages of the expired passports claiming that the passport has been "extended". After a total lockdown  after the onset of the global COVID-19 pandemic, many Turkmen nationals abroad have been trapped in a limbo with expired passports and a stamp that claims to "extend" the validity of the passport alongside a QR code that, when scanned (with an Android device), opens a Google search query which includes passport details in text format. As of middle 2022, it remains unclear if the stamp and a QR code are regarded as legitimate abroad.

Types of passports
 An ordinary passport is issued to all citizens. It has a green cover and is valid for 10 years.
 A diplomatic passport is issued to diplomats and high-ranking officials. It's dark green.
 A service passport is issued to mid and low-ranking officials. It has a blue cover.

See also
 Visa requirements for Turkmen citizens

References

External links

Turkmenistan
Foreign relations of Turkmenistan